Victoria is a rural municipality in Prince Edward Island, Canada. A historic seaport, the community is situated at the extreme southwestern edge of Queens County in the township of Lot 29.

In recent decades the community has branded itself as "Victoria-by-the-Sea" to honour its heritage as a seaport and to attract tourists.

History 
Victoria, tucked neatly on the south shore of Prince Edward Island, halfway between PEI's largest cities of Charlottetown and Summerside, was founded in 1819 by James Bardin Palmer, an immigrant lawyer and agent for the Earl of Westmoreland. His son Donald, following a well-conceived plan, laid out the community on Palmer's estate. The effect can still be seen today by the grid pattern of its streets.

By the late 1800s the settlement was prosperous with three wharves and many thriving businesses. Because of its sheltered harbour and strategic location, Victoria became an important seaport with a significant amount of trade with Europe, the West Indies and other East Coast ports.
A wide variety of produce, including potatoes and eggs, was shipped by schooner from Victoria until the early 1900s. In the days of the steamboats Victoria was a regular stop for the SS Harland, dropping off visitors from Charlottetown and places further afield, to spend a few days relaxing in the community by the sea.

To accommodate the increase in shipping commerce and traveling visitors, the community developed services to cater to them including hotels, a general store various stores and, a bank, a rink, a fox farm, a blacksmith shop, and a farm equipment dealer.

The rink was home to the Victoria Union, one of the most successful hockey teams in the Maritimes. When the Trans-Canada Highway bypassed Victoria many businesses and facilities relocated to nearby Crapaud. Today, with a year-round population of under two hundred, there are a number of family-run businesses employing local people, just as there were in the prosperous years up to the 1950s.

In the February 1982 Atlantic Insight, Stephen Kimber commented on the community,The Trans-Canada Highway bypassed Victoria. So did the shopping centres and tourist amusement parks.And that - along with its independent-minded citizens - is what makes Victoria the enchanting, picture post card place it is today."

Demographics 

Economy 
There is agricultural and fishing activity in Victoria by the sea as well as an aquaculture research & development facility. However, tourism is a major aspect of the community's economy. There are multiple restaurants, gift shops, and inns. Visitors can get a true sense of the history of the community by viewing the exhibit Keeper’s of the Light at the Victoria Seaport Museum, which is located in Palmer's Range Light.

References

External links 

Communities in Queens County, Prince Edward Island
Rural municipalities in Prince Edward Island